The following is a list of vessels notable in the history of the Canadian province of British Columbia, including Spanish, Russian, American and other military vessels and all commercial vessels on inland waters as well as on saltwater routes up to the end of World War II (1945).

A

B

C

D

E

F

G

H

I

J

K

L

M

N

O

P

Q

R

S

T

U

V

W

Y

See also 
Steamboats of the Upper Fraser River in British Columbia
Steamboats of the Skeena River
Steamboats of the Arrow Lakes
Steamboats of Lake Okanagan
Vessels of the Lakes Route
Graveyard of the Pacific
Inside Passage
Puget Sound Mosquito Fleet
American Bay

References 

British Columbia Chronicle:  Adventurers by Sea and Land, Helen B. Akrigg and G.P.V. Akrigg, Discovery Press, Vancouver, 1975.  ISBN
British Columbia Chronicle:  Gold and Colonists, Helen B. Akrigg and G.P.V. Akrigg, Discovery Press, Vancouver, 1977.  ISBN
The Nootka Connection, Derek Pethick, Douglas & McIntyre, Vancouver, 1980.  ISBN
British Columbia Archives

External links 
Archibald Menzies: An Inventory of Ships off the Northwest Coast, 1792, Center for the Study of the Pacific Northwest, University of Washington
Colonial Despatches: The colonial despatches of Vancouver Island and British Columbia 1846-1871, Humanities Computing and Media Centre, University of Victoria
The California Sea Otter Trade, 1784-1848, Appendix: Identified Vessels Engaged in the California Sea Otter Trade 1786-1848. Provides details for numerous ships listed on this page

British Columbia
History of British Columbia
Water transport in British Columbia
Ships